Teal Sherer is an American actress with a physical disability who is an advocate for the inclusion of performers with disabilities in the entertainment industry. She is best known for her portrayal of Venom in the web series The Guild and as herself in her own series "My Gimpy Life". She was also a member of Full Radius Dance.

Career

Early career
While in college, Teal performed in plays such as The House of Bernarda Alba and Antigone.  In addition to performance, she participated more and more fully in the aspects of live theatre, such as stage management, ushering, and ticket sales.  In addition, she performed with the Full Radius Dance Company, a physically integrated dance troupe.  Her first role in a feature film was in 2004, in Kenneth Branagh's film Warm Springs alongside Cynthia Nixon, Kathy Bates, Branagh himself, and Felicia Day.

Current Productions
In 2011 Teal created a pilot called "My Gimpy Life", envisioned as a comedy, written by Gabe Uhr, and directed by Sean Becker. It premiered at ITVfest on August 6, 2011..  The second season of "My Gimpy Life" began its Kickstarter campaign on May 15, 2013.

Personal life
Teal was born to Suzanne and Charles Sherer, and grew up near Knoxville, Tennessee.  At the age of 14, en route to a Labor Day fireworks show, Teal was involved in an automobile accident.  Her injuries to her back left her paraplegic.  Teal regained her independence and mobility through undergoing therapy at the Shepherd Center in Atlanta, Georgia.

Teal graduated from Lenior City High School, and went on to study at Oglethorpe University.  While a student there, she found her passion for acting.  In 2004, while still living in Atlanta, she was cast in Warm Springs.

In 2012, she married Ali Alsaleh.

References

External links
 Home Page
 Full Radius Dance

American television actresses
Living people
American female dancers
American dancers
1980 births
People with paraplegia
American web series actresses
21st-century American actresses
Actors with disabilities